KTSM may refer to:

 KTSM-TV, a television station (channel 9 virtual/16 digital) licensed to El Paso, Texas, United States
 KTSM (AM), a radio station (690 AM) licensed to El Paso, Texas, United States
 KTSM-FM, a radio station (99.9 FM) licensed to El Paso, Texas, United States